Tsunade, featured in the Japanese folktale , was a young maiden who married Jiraiya and helped him defeat Orochimaru. She mastered slug magic and could walk on water.

Influences on fiction 
In the manga and anime series Naruto, a character named Tsunade served as the Hokage (leader) of the village where the protagonist Naruto Uzumaki lives. She is known as the world's strongest kunoichi (female ninja) and the greatest medical ninja. Tsunade, Jiraiya, and Orochimaru appear as three legendary ninja known as the Sannin. Naruto Tsunade can summon slugs into battle, up to and including kaiju-sized monsters. This summoning ability is predicated on Tsunade having established a blood-contract with all slug species. Jiraiya and Orochimaru can also summon and shapeshift into toads and snakes respectively. The repeated loss of her loved ones caused Tsunade to later abandon the life of a ninja for many years. But after being convinced by Jiraiya and Naruto, she is eventually persuaded to return to their village and take on the mantle of the fifth Hokage.

References

External links
The Gallant Jiraiya

Fictional ninja
Fictional female ninja
Shapeshifting
Fictional characters who use magic